Martin Kaltenpoth (born in 1977 in Hagen) is a German evolutionary ecologist.

Scientific career 
After studying biology at the University of Würzburg, which was supported by the German Academic Scholarship Foundation (Studienstiftung), Kaltenpoth completed his doctorate in 2006 under the supervision of Erhard Strohm on the topic Protective bacteria and attractive pheromones - symbiosis and chemical communication in beewolves. He was a postdoctoral researcher at the University of Regensburg and the University of Utah in Salt Lake City. In 2009, he joined the Max Planck Institute for Chemical Ecology as head of the Max Planck Research Group Insect Symbiosis. In 2015, he was appointed Chair of Evolutionary Ecology at the University of Mainz. Since 2020, he has been Director and Scientific Member at the Max Planck Institute for Chemical Ecology and Head of the Department of Insect Symbiosis.

Research 
Kaltenpoth studies symbioses between insects and microorganisms. Bacteria are important partners for their hosts, as they help open up new habitats and the exploit new food sources. They also play a vital role in their host insects’ defense against enemies. The goal of Kaltenpoth's research is to characterize the diversity of bacterial symbionts in insects and their importance for the ecology of their hosts, tracing their evolutionary origin.

Honors and awards 
 Student Research Grant Award, Animal Behavior Society, USA, 2001
 Theodore Roosevelt Memorial Grant, American Museum of Natural History, USA, 2002
 Biocenter Science Award of the University of Würzburg, 2006
 Award of the Ingrid Weiss / Horst Wiehe Foundation, German Society for General and Applied Entomology (DGaaE), 2007
 Young Scientist Award, Society for Experimental Biology (SEB), United Kingdom, 2007
 Thuringian Science Award of the Thuringian Ministry for Economy, Science and Digital Society, Germany, 2014
 Griswold Lecture, Department of Entomology, Cornell University, USA, 2018
 European Research Council (ERC) Consolidator Grant, 2019

Weblinks 
 Website of the Department of Insect Symbiosis at the MPI for Chemical Ecology

References 

1977 births
Living people
University of Würzburg alumni
Max Planck Institute directors